Cliffwood Beach  is an unincorporated community and census-designated place (CDP) located within Aberdeen Township in Monmouth County, New Jersey. As of the 2010 U.S. census, the CDP's population was 3,194.

History

Matawan Township was incorporated on February 23, 1857. This included a portion of Middletown Point (now Matawan Borough), a portion Mt. Pleasant (renamed Freneau in 1890) and Matawan (or "Matavan" or Matawan Point) beach. The beach area of Matawan Township would later be renamed Cliffwood Beach.

A Cliffwood Beach directional sign is seen briefly in the 1939 documentary The City (with music by Aaron Copland).  An unending traffic jam getting to the beach is used in the film as an endemic problem of unplanned growth.

Cliffwood Beach was purchased in 1860 by Henry Clark, who planned on creating a resort community.  Although the concept initially failed, in 1923, the company of Morrisey and Walker, created the concept of a resort community in Cliffwood Beach, with summer bungalows complementing the emerging resorts of the Jersey shoreline of the 1920s. The real estate sales offices of Morrisey and Walker was a local attraction in of itself, being contracted in the appearance of a pirate ship, as an homage to the lore of Captain Kidd and his treasure and Treasure Lake in Cliffwood Beach.

In 1924, a one-mile boardwalk was constructed along the shoreline of Cliffwood Beach.  In 1926 the Country Club Casino was built along the cliff walk, overlooking Treasure Lake.  Also in 1926, the Cat 'n Fiddle restaurant opened, along with a Merry-Go-Round and an arcade.  In 1928, construction began for a salt water pool adjacent to the boardwalk and Treasure Lake.  Completed in 1929, it was a state attraction, frequented by Olympic Medalists- George Kojak and Johnny Weissmullen.  Weissmullen later became famous for his role as "Tarzan."

Cliffwood Beach was a popular resort until the 1950s, with a boardwalk, saltwater swimming pool, dining and dancing at The Cat 'n Fiddle, and other amusements. The beachfront facilities were destroyed by a series of hurricanes in 1954 {Hurricanes: Carol (8/30/1954), Edna (9/11/1954) and Hurricane Hazel (10/15/1954)}.  In 1955 Hurricane Diane destroyed all that had remained of Cliffwood Beach's amusements, with the exception of the saltwater pool.

Cliffwood Beach was an early recipient of aid through the New Jersey Department of Environmental Protection's Green Acres Program , which was established in 1961. The township received funds to build a park near the Cliffwood Beach waterfront. The tennis courts have since been converted to an enclosed in-line skating arena, and the original playground equipment and two basketball courts have been upgraded.

It was featured in Weird NJ magazine's Issue #28. The article, "Cliffwood Beach: A Forgotten Resort", recounted the abrupt manner in which the town was forgotten.

Nothing remains of any of the boardwalk amusements except for the large swimming pool, which lies abandoned and filled with debris.

On August 8, 2017, the township opened the beachfront Veterans Park, which includes a pirate-ship themed spray park for all ages; two pirate themed playgrounds, one for kids 2-5 and the other 5–12; a picnic grove with shade, a multi-purpose field for little league, softball, and soccer; a kayak and small water craft launch; a gazebo/band shell; a flagpole and War Veteran's Memorial Monument; and a restroom/equipment/storage building.

On July 19, 2018, the township completed and opened the Aberdeen Sea Walk, a half-mile trail that primarily runs along the original damaged seawall, and it features 9 fishing outcrops, 15 outlooks, several benches, and a gazebo. There are 38 LED pathway lights as well as several security cameras to prevent vandalism. A five-foot teak boardwalk outlet path was added by the gazebo to the beach. The project fully connected Beach Dr. and Lakeshore Dr., creating the first fully connected recreational infrastructure for the first time in decades.

Geography

According to the United States Census Bureau, the CDP had a total area of 0.960 square miles (2.486 km2), including 0.908 square miles (2.353 km2) of land and 0.052 square miles (0.133 km2) of water (5.42%).

Cliffwood Beach is located north of Route 35 and is bounded by Keyport on the east and Laurence Harbor on the west. The community faces Raritan Bay, including a portion of Keyport Harbor, and Matawan Creek separates Cliffwood Beach from Keyport. To the west, a section of Cliffwood Beach is part of Old Bridge Township in neighboring Middlesex County. The counties are separated by Whale Creek, which is spanned near the bayfront by a concrete bridge. Cliffwood Beach is the home of Guadalcanal Veterans of Foreign Wars (VFW) Post Number 4745, which is used as a community hall, rental facility, and polling place for elections. Adjacent to the VFW Post is Veterans of Foreign Wars Park (VFW Park), which contains Alvin Ross Memorial Field. The field, which has two softball diamonds, backstops, team benches and bleachers, is used for local children's and adults' softball and soccer leagues scheduled by the Aberdeen Township Department of Parks and Recreation. The Aberdeen Township Public Service Facility on Lenox Road is the maintenance and recycling facility for the township.

Education
Cliffwood Beach, as a part of Aberdeen, is served by the Matawan-Aberdeen Regional School District.

Cliffwood Beach is also home of the Yeshiva Gedolah of Cliffwood, an institution for advanced Talmudic studies. Headed by Rabbi Shimon Alster, who founded the Yeshiva in September 2004, this institution supplies guidance for young rabbinic scholars, in the areas of Talmudic exegesis, Jewish law and ethics, and intensive Bible study.

Demographics

Census 2010

Census 2000
As of the 2000 U.S. census, there were 3,538 people, 1,149 households, and 881 families residing in the CDP. The population density was 1,468.8/km2 (3,809.2/mi2). There were 1,178 housing units at an average density of 489.1/km2 (1,268.3/mi2). The racial makeup of the CDP was 78.60% White, 15.04% African American, 0.31% Native American, 1.36% Asian, 2.88% from other races, and 1.81% from two or more races. Hispanic or Latino of any race were 9.78% of the population.

There were 1,149 households, out of which 38.1% had children under the age of 18 living with them, 57.2% were married couples living together, 14.1% had a female householder with no husband present, and 23.3% were non-families. 16.4% of all households were made up of individuals, and 4.9% had someone living alone who was 65 years of age or older. The average household size was 2.99 and the average family size was 3.37.

In the CDP, the population was spread out, with 26.5% under the age of 18, 7.5% from 18 to 24, 33.7% from 25 to 44, 22.5% from 45 to 64, and 9.8% who were 65 years of age or older. The median age was 36 years. For every 100 females, there were 98.3 males. For every 100 females age 18 and over, there were 94.2 males.

The median income for a household in the CDP was $57,098, and the median income for a family was $61,875. Males had a median income of $44,856 versus $32,714 for females. The per capita income for the CDP was $22,874. About 5.0% of families and 5.5% of the population were below the poverty line, including 7.2% of those under age 18 and 6.5% of those age 65 or over.

Transportation
New Jersey Transit provides local bus service on the 817 route.

New Jersey Route 35 runs along the area, being the dividing line between Cliffwood Beach and Cliffwood.

References

External links

2006-07 Installation of Officers

Census-designated places in Monmouth County, New Jersey
Raritan Bayshore
Aberdeen Township, New Jersey